The 2003 CONCACAF U-20 Qualifying Tournament was held to determine the four CONCACAF entrants into the 2003 FIFA World Youth Championship, which was hosted in United Arab Emirates.

Qualified teams

The following teams qualified for the tournament:

Group stage

Group A

Standings

 Panama and Mexico qualified.

Group B

Standings

 Canada and USA qualified.

See also
 2003 CONCACAF U-20 Tournament qualifying
 CONCACAF Under-20 Championship
 2003 FIFA World Youth Championship

External links
Results by RSSSF

CONCACAF Under-20 Championship
U-20
International association football competitions hosted by Panama
International association football competitions hosted by the United States
2003 in youth association football